SAGE Open is an open access, peer-reviewed, academic mega journal. It is the "first broad spectrum open access title aimed specifically at the behavioral and social sciences communities".

It was established in May 2011 and is published by SAGE Publications. The charge to authors (APC) was initially free, then US$99, but from mid 2015 this went to $395. By 2019 it was $480, followed by an increase to $800 later that year following the journal's acceptance into Web of Science.  As of 1st January 2023, the APC is $1,500.

Abstracting and indexing 
The journal is abstracted and indexed in Scopus, the Social Science Citation Index with an impact factor of 2.032, DOAJ and ERIC.

References

External links 
 

SAGE Publishing academic journals
Multidisciplinary academic journals
Creative Commons Attribution-licensed journals
Publications established in 2011
Continuous journals